HMCS Comox was a  built for the Royal Canadian Navy during the Cold War. The vessel was named for Comox Harbour, a bay in British Columbia. The minesweeper was later transferred to the Turkish Navy where she was renamed Tirebolu and served until 1996.

Design
The Bay class were designed and ordered as replacements for the Second World War-era minesweepers that the Royal Canadian Navy operated at the time.

They had a complement of 38 officers and ratings.

The Bay-class minesweepers were powered by two GM 12-cylinder diesel engines driving two shafts creating . The ships were armed with one Bofors 40 mm gun and were equipped with minesweeping gear.

Service history

Comox was laid down on 8 June 1951 by Victoria Machinery Depot at Victoria with the yard number 53 and launched on 24 April 1952. The vessel was commissioned into the Royal Canadian Navy on 2 April 1954 with the hull identification number 146.

Comox spent three years in service with the Royal Canadian Navy. The minesweeper was paid off on 11 September 1957. She was transferred to Turkey on 31 March 1958 and renamed TCG Tirebolu with the identification number M-352. She was sold in 1996.

References

Notes

Citations

References
 
 
 
 

Minesweepers of the Royal Canadian Navy
Bay-class minesweepers
Ships built in British Columbia
1952 ships
Cold War minesweepers of Canada